Jacques-Henri Laffite (born 21 November 1943) is a French former racing driver who competed in Formula One from  to . He achieved six Grand Prix wins, all while driving for the Ligier team. From 1997 to 2013, Laffite was a presenter for TF1.

Early years
Jacques-Henri Laffite was born in Paris on 21 November 1943. He attended the Cours Hattemer, a private school. He was trained as a racing driver in 1968 at Winfield Racing School in France.

Formula One career
Laffite debuted in Formula One in 1974 for Frank Williams' Iso–Marlboro team. The following year he raced for the same team, now named Williams, scoring a second place in the German Grand Prix at the Nürburgring.

In  Laffite moved to the French Ligier team, scoring 20 points and a pole position at the Italian Grand Prix. The next two seasons were transitional, although he managed to win his first Grand Prix at Anderstorp in the 1977 Swedish Grand Prix.

The 1979 season opened with Laffite winning the first two races. He fought for the World Championship title until the last races, but eventually placed only fourth, with 36 points. The following two seasons were similar, with two more fourth places in the Championship and a further three victories. In 1982, however, Laffite finished only 17th in the final classification, with only 5 points scored.

During the early 1980s, Laffite also made three end of season trips to Australia to race in the non-championship Australian Grand Prix. He failed to finish his first race in 1981 (he was lucky to start after his car hit the wall on the outside of the last turn of the short (1.609 km (1.000 mi)) Calder Park Raceway in qualifying, but his local crew were able to repair it for the race). He finished second to fellow Frenchman Alain Prost in 1982, and third behind Brazilian Roberto Moreno and Australian John Smith in 1983. In all of his pre-Formula One AGP drives, Laffite drove a Formula Pacific or Formula Mondial Ralt RT4 powered by a 1.6-litre Ford l4 engine.

Results in the next two seasons were not much better, when he moved back to England, again to race for Williams (11 and 5 points, respectively). Now in his forties, Laffite returned to Ligier in 1985: in that season he was on the podium three times (Great Britain, Germany and Australia), for a total of 16 points. In 1986 he scored 14 points including two more podium finishes in the first half of the season, but he broke both legs in a crash at the start of the British Grand Prix at Brands Hatch, and thereafter retired from Formula One. The race was stopped and restarted without Laffite, who was thus classified as a non-starter and ended his career tied with Graham Hill for the most Grand Prix starts. He was the most successful driver in Ligier's history, having taken six of their nine wins.

As a result of Laffite's injuries, new safety rules were enforced from the  season that stated that in all cars the driver's feet must be behind the front axle line.

Post-Formula One career
Laffite recovered from his injuries and later raced in touring cars, finishing 17th in the inaugural World Touring Car Championship driving an Alfa Romeo 75 for Alfa Corse as well as racing three seasons in the German-based DTM series.

He is now a television commentator for the French network TF1, best known for his reaction to the incident at the 1997 European Grand Prix in which Michael Schumacher collided with Jacques Villeneuve, and Laffite reacted with curse words on live television.

Laffite made his 2007 FIA GT3 European Championship debut at the 2008 Bucharest City Challenge, driving for AutoGT Racing Team.

In October 2008, at the age of 64, he tested a Renault R27 F1 car at the Paul Ricard circuit.

Laffite has two daughters: Camille and Margot, a sports journalist of Formula One on Canal+. He is also golf enthusiast, is a shareholder of Dijon-Bourgogne Golf.

Also deeply attached to the Creuse for Golf Fisheries and nature, he has a property in Creuse near Aubusson.

Racing record

Career summary

 Graded drivers not eligible for European Formula Two Championship points

Complete 24 Hours of Le Mans results

Complete European Formula Two Championship results
(key) (Races in bold indicate pole position; races in italics indicate fastest lap)

 Graded drivers not eligible for European Formula Two Championship points

Complete Formula One World Championship results
(key) (Races in bold indicate pole position, races in italics indicate fastest lap)

Complete World Touring Car Championship results
(key) (Races in bold indicate pole position) (Races in italics indicate fastest lap)

* Overall race position shown. Registered WTCC points paying position may differ.

Complete Deutsche Tourenwagen Meisterschaft results
(key) (Races in bold indicate pole position) (Races in italics indicate fastest lap)

Complete Grand Prix Masters results
(key) Races in bold indicate pole position, races in italics indicate fastest lap.

Other results
 800 km of Dijon: 1st, 1975
 1000 km of Monza: 1st, 1975
 1000 km of Nürburgring: 1st, 1975
 500 km of Monza: 1st, 1988 (class win)
 500 km of Nürburgring: 1st, 1988 (class win)
 3 hours of Zhuhai: 1st, 1994

Notes
 The fastest lap at the 1976 Japanese Grand Prix was initially credited to Masahiro Hasemi. This was a measurement mistake, and, several days later, the circuit issued a press release to correct the fastest lap holder of the race to Laffite. This press release was promptly made known in Japan, and the Japan Automobile Federation (JAF) and Japanese media corrected the record. But this correction was not made well known outside Japan, thus, Hasemi is credited with the fastest lap of the race in many record books.

References

French racing drivers
French Formula Renault 2.0 drivers
French Formula One drivers
Ligier Formula One drivers
Williams Formula One drivers
Formula One race winners
European Formula Two Championship drivers
French Formula Three Championship drivers
Racing drivers from Paris
1943 births
Living people
Grand Prix Masters drivers
Deutsche Tourenwagen Masters drivers
24 Hours of Le Mans drivers
World Touring Car Championship drivers
World Sportscar Championship drivers
24 Hours of Spa drivers
Oreca drivers
Team Joest drivers
Larbre Compétition drivers
BMW M drivers